Muthabin (transliteration: Mūʿtabīn, also spelled Mothabeen) is a village in southern Syria, administratively part of the Daraa Governorate, located northeast of Daraa in the al-Sanamayn District. Nearby localities include Ghabaghib to the north, al-Masmiyah to the east, Jabab to the southeast, Bassir to the south, al-Sanamayn to the southwest and Deir al-Bukht to the west. According to the Syria Central Bureau of Statistics (CBS), Muthabin had a population of 2,351 in the 2004 census.

History
Muthabin dates back to antiquity, having been mentioned in pre-Islamic Syriac texts.

In 1838, Mutabin was noted as a ruin, situated "the Nukra, north of Al-Shaykh Maskin".

References

Bibliography

External links
  Map of town, Google Maps
 Sanameine-map, 19L

Populated places in Al-Sanamayn District